The 2009–10 Welsh League Cup group stage matches took place between 18 August and 20 October 2009.  The draw for the eight groups took place on 29 June 2009.

At the completion of the group stage, the top team in each group will advance to play in the Quarter finals, along with the two best placed runners up.

Groups

Group 1

Group 2

Group 3

Group 4

Group 5

Group 6

References

External links
Official League Cup Website
 Welsh-Premier.com Loosemores League Cup

Group